Sinnar (Pronunciation: [sinːəɾ]) is a city and a municipal council in Sinnar taluka of Nashik district in the Indian state of Maharashtra. Sinnar is the fourth largest city in Nashik district after Nashik, Malegaon and Manmad.

History 
Traditionally, it is believed that Sinnar was founded by Rav Singuni, a Gavli chieftain. His son Rav Govinda built the great temple of Gondeshwara at a cost of 2lakh rupees. 

At its peak, the Seuna or Yadava dynasty (850 - 1334) ruled a kingdom stretching from the Tungabhadra to the Narmada Rivers, including present-day Maharashtra, north Karnataka and parts of Madhya Pradesh. The capital was at Devagiri, now known as Daulatabad in Maharashtra. The reign of the Yadava dynasty declined after the conquest of the Daulatabad Fort by Alauddin Khalji in 1294. Khilji used tactics which were unthinkable to the evolved, cultured minds of those times such as raping women, mass killing of surrendered soldiers, breaking of temples, kidnapping, ravaging innocent villages, poisoning wells and rivers and breaking all treaties as per convenience. Further conquest by Malik Kafur, Alauddin's general, in 1312 resulted in the killing of the members of the Yadava clan ending this illustrious dynasty. It is also the birthplace of Baji Rao I,the mighty general of Maratha Empire.

Geography 

It has an average elevation of 651.4 metres (2135 feet). Sinnar is one of the major industrial zones of Malegaon (MIDC) built around the city of Nashik which have multiple international production companies. It lies 30 km southeast of Nashik city on the Pune - Nashik Highway.

Demographics 
 India census, Sinnar had a population of 65,299. Males constitute 52% of the population and females 48%. Sinnar has an average literacy rate of 71%, higher than the national average of 59.5%: male literacy is 77%, and female literacy is 64%. In Sinnar, 15% of the population is under 6 years of age.

Culture 

The Gondeshwar Temple, an 11th-12th century temple dedicated to Shiva, is located in Sinnar.

The Gargoti Museum houses a collection of mineral specimens native to the region.

References

Cities and towns in Nashik district